Robowar (also known as Robot da guerra) is a 1988 science fiction-action-horror film, starring Reb Brown, Catherine Hickland, and Massimo Vanni. Directed by Bruno Mattei under his most common pseudonym, Vincent Dawn, and written by the husband and wife team of Claudio Fragasso and Rosella Drudi, Robowar is a rip-off of the 1987 American film Predator, in the tradition of Shocking Dark and Strike Commando, both also directed by Mattei.  Although featuring a partially American cast, the movie was not released in the United States until 2019, when Severin Films gave it a Blu-Ray release.

Plot
Major Marphy Black leads a group of commandos through the jungles of an unnamed island, but unknown to all involved but Mascher, they are being stalked by Mascher's robot invention, Omega-1. Over Mascher's protests, the group first saves a volunteer hospital worker, Virgin, from a band of guerrillas, then take out the hospital camp, killing all the guerrillas there, also.  At this point, the robot begins killing members of the commando group, one by one.  That night, Mascher admits to Marphy that he created Omega-1, that it was acting sporadically, and that he was there to check out the match-up between the decorated Marphy and Omega-1.

The next day, they continue, and are further stalked by the robot.  At one point, as Mascher reviews a computer to check Omega-1's location, one of the commandos tosses it into the river, declaring that Macscher is now in the same danger they are.  Later, Mascher reveals the radio device which can destroy Omega-1, but the robot kills Mascher and others, leaving only Black and Virgin, and takes the radio destruct device.  That night, Black listens to an audiotape given by Mascher, which reveals that Omega-1 is a human/machine hybrid, whose human parts were made up of the brain of Black's old friend, Lt. Martin Woodrie.  Omega-1 attacks in the house they're hiding, but Virgin stuns the robot with acid, and Black blows up the house.  Black and Virgin reach the shore, and try to signal the boat, but Omega-1 catches up, and chases Black into the jungle.  Cornering him, the robot removes the visor of his mask, hands Black the destruct radio, and instructs him to key the destruct sequence.  Black does so, and returns to the shore.

Cast
 Reb Brown as Maj. Marphy Black
 Catherine Hickland as Virgin
 Massimo Vanni as Pvt. Larry Guarino
 Romano Puppo as	Cpl. Neil Corey
 Claudio Fragasso as Omega-1, The Hunter (as Clyde Anderson)
 Max Laurel as Quang
 Jim Gaines as Sonny "Blood" Peel
 John P. Dulaney as Arthur "Papa Doc" Bray
 Mel Davidson as Mascher

Reception
In Spinegrinders: The Movies Most Critics Won't Talk About, Clive Davies writes, "Predator ripoff with a cyborg is a mindless bore after five minutes."

References

External links
 
 Robowar at Variety Distribution

1988 films
1980s action horror films
Italian action horror films
English-language Italian films
Films directed by Bruno Mattei
Films shot in the Philippines
Philippine action horror films
1980s English-language films
1980s Italian films